Vərgədüz (also, Vergyaduz) is a village and municipality in the Yardymli Rayon of Azerbaijan.  It has a population of 1,248.

References

External links

Populated places in Yardimli District